The sixth election to the Carmarthenshire County Council was held in March 1904. It was preceded by the 1901 election and followed by the 1907 election.

Overview of the Result

The Liberals retained a strong majority with a majority of members returned unopposed. From the outset the election was dominated by the debate over the implementation of the 1902 Education Act, which was fiercely opposed by the radial wing of the Welsh Liberal Party.

Candidates

The election was fought on more explicitly political lines, largely as a result of the way the education question dominated the election. Following the nominations, the Liberals already had a majority due to the number of candidates returned unopposed. These included all eight candidates in the Llanelli Urban area, including Joseph Roberts, who was returned unopposed for the division previously represented by the veteran tinplate leader, Tom Phillips, who retired due too ill-health.

Several sitting members, mainly Anglican landowners, changed their political allegiance due to the Education question. These included J.W. Gwynne-Hughes of Tregib (Llandeilo).

Only six of those elected at the first election, and who had served continuosly since then, sought re-election.

Outcome

There were a small number of changes. At Laugharne, J.D. Morse, the member since 1889, was defeated.

Contested Elections

There were only a small number of contested elections and the majorities were small in most instances.

As at previous elections, retiring aldermen were not required to seek re-election. The aldermen who retired at the election were

J.S. Tregoning, Iscoed, Conservative 
John Lewis, Meirios Hall, Liberal 
D.L. Jones, Derlwyn, Liberal 
R.W. Stephens, Coedybrain, Liberal 
Rev. W. Thomas, Whitland, Liberal 
David Evans, Llangennech, Liberal 
Rev. William Davies, Llandilo, Liberal 
J. Williams, Llanginning, Liberal
James Hill-Johnes, Dolaucothy, Conservative

Ward Results

In view of the controversy over education candidates stood as Unionists rather than Conservatives. However, the label Unionist has been used only for those former Liberals who stood under this banner.

Abergwili

Bettws

Caio

Carmarthen Eastern Ward (Lower Division)

Carmarthen Eastern Ward (Upper Division)

Carmarthen Western Ward (Lower Division)

Carmarthen Western Ward (Upper Division)

Cenarth

Cilycwm

Conwil

Kidwelly

Laugharne

Llanarthney

Llanboidy
David Thomas had been elected as a Conservative in 1901.

Llandebie

Llandilo Rural
William Jones had been elected as an Independent at previous elections.

Llandilo Urban
Gwynne Hughes had previously sat as a Liberal.

Llandovery

Llanedy

Llanegwad
Gwynne Hughes had previously sat as a Liberal and failed to defend the seat as an Unionist.

Llanelly Division.1

Llanelly Division 2

Llanelly Division 3

Llanelly Division 4

Llanelly Division 5

Llanelly Division 6

Llanelly Division 7

Llanelly Division 8

Llanelly Rural, Berwick

Llanelly Rural, Hengoed

Llanelly Rural, Westfa and Glyn

Llanfihangel Aberbythick

Llanfihangel-ar-Arth

Llangadock

Llangeler

Llangendeirne

Llangennech

Llangunnor

Llanon

Llansawel

Llanstephan

Llanybyther
Williams was one of two Liberal candidates in 1901 when both polled the same number of votes and Williams lost on the toss of a coin.

Mothvey

Pembrey North

Pembrey South
this ward was not recorded in the local press.

Quarter Bach

Rhydcymmerai

St Clears
Dr Thomas had sat as a Conservative but was said to have fought this election as a 'radical'.

St Ishmael

Trelech

Whitland

Election of Aldermen

In addition to the 51 councillors the council consisted of 17 county aldermen. Aldermen were elected by the council, and served a six-year term. Following the elections the following nine aldermen were elected (with the number of votes recorded in each case).

The following retiring aldermen were re-elected:

John Williams, retiring alderman (47)
John Lewis, retiring alderman (45)
D.L. Jones, retiring alderman (42)
R.W. Stephens, retiring alderman (48)
John Rees, retiring alderman (42)
Rev William Davies, retiring alderman (42)

In addition, two new aldermen were elected:

W.N. Jones, elected member for Betws (46)
Thomas Jones, elected member for Llanelli Ward 7 (42)
Rev Thomas Johns, elected member for Llanelli Ward 4 (42

Four retiring aldermen was not re-elected

J.S. Tregoning, Iscoed, Conservative 
Rev. W. Thomas, Whitland, Liberal 
David Evans, Llangennech, Liberal 
James Hill-Johnes, Dolaucothy, Conservative

All the elected aldermen were supported by the majority of members.

References

1904
1904 Welsh local elections